Bevers saga or Bevis saga is an Old Norse chivalric saga, translated from a now lost version of the Anglo-Norman poem Boeve de Haumtone. Kalinke summarises the saga as follows: "The work is a medieval soap opera that commences with the murder of Bevers's father, instigated by Bevers's mother, and carried out by a rival wooer who in turn is killed by Bevers. The ensuing plot includes enslavement, imprisonment, abductions, separations, childbirth, heathen-Christian military and other encounters - Bevers marries a Muslim princess - and mass conversions."

Manuscripts 
Bevis saga survives only in Icelandic manuscripts. It is preserved almost intact in two medieval manuscripts, Perg. 4to. no. 6 (c. 1400) and Stock. Perg fol. no. 7 (late 15th century). It was also included in Ormsbók, a 14th-century compilation of chivalric sagas, which now only survives in paper copies from the 17th century (Papp. fol. no. 46).

Kalinke and Mitchell identified the following manuscripts of the saga:

Further reading

References 

Bevis of Hampton
Chivalric sagas
Old Norse literature

External links
A volume containing the Old Norse text (in the spelling of the original manuscript) in the Internet Archive